Perdrix (also known as The Bare Necessity) is a 2019 French drama film directed by Erwan Le Duc. It was screened in the Directors' Fortnight section at the 2019 Cannes Film Festival.

Cast
 Alexandre Steiger
 Fanny Ardant
 Maud Wyler
 Nicolas Maury
 Patience Munchenbach
 Swann Arlaud

References

External links
 

2019 films
2019 drama films
French drama films
2010s French-language films
2010s French films